Matoatoa brevipes is a species of gecko, a lizard in the family Gekkonidae. The species is endemic to Madagascar.

Geographic range
M. brevipes is found along the southwestern coast of Madagascar.

Habitat
M. brevipes is found in hollow tree branches within dry open spiny forest.

Behavior
M. brevipes is a nocturnal species.

References

Further reading
Mocquard F (1900). "Diagnoses d'espèces nouvelles de Reptiles de Madagascar ". Bulletin du Muséum national d'Histoire naturelle, Paris 6: 345–348. (Phyllodactylus brevipes, new species, p. 346). (in French).
Nussbaum RA, Raxworthy CJ, Pronk O (1998). "The Ghost Geckos of Madagascar: A Further Revision of the Malagasy Leaf-toed Geckos (Reptilia, Squamata, Gekkonidae)". Misc. Publ. Mus. Zool. Univ. Michigan (186): 1–26. (Matoatoa brevipes, new combination, p. 2).

Matoatoa
Reptiles of Madagascar
Endemic fauna of Madagascar
Taxa named by François Mocquard
Reptiles described in 1900